The Mashavera is a river of southern Georgia. It is a right tributary of the Khrami. It flows through the towns Dmanisi and Bolnisi.

References

Rivers of Georgia (country)